The Donguz Formation, Donguz Svita, or Donguz Rocks is a Middle Triassic geological formation that crops out on the right bank of Donguz River in Orenburg Oblast, Russia, across the settlement of Pervomaisky. The formation is equivalent to a biostratigraphic unit, the Donguz Gorizont. It is famous for its rich collection of the fossils of Middle Triassic tetrapods.

It is a nature monument (особо охраняемых природных территорий (ООПТ)).

Fossil content 
The following fossils have been found in the Donguz Formation:

 Temnospondyls 
 Eryosuchus antiquus, Ochev
 E. garjainovi, Ochev
 E. tverdochlebovi, Ochev
 Bukobaja? sp.
 Plagiorophus danilovi
 Plagioscutum ochevi, Shishkin
 Plagiosternum paraboliceps (Konzhukova)
 Thecodonts
 Jushatyria vjushkovi
 Procolophonid
 Kapes serotinus, Novikov
 Proterosuchids
 Sarmatosuchus ochevi, Sennikov
 Erythrosuchids
 Uralosaurus magnus, (Ochev)
 Rauisuchidae
 Dongusia colorata, Huene
 Vjushkovisaurus berdjanensis, Ochev
 Euparkeriidae
 Dorosuchus neoetus, Sennikov
 Dicynodonts
 Kannemeyeria spp.
 Shansiodon (Rhinodicynodon) gracile (Kalandadze)
 Therocephalians
 Dongusaurus schepetovi, Vyushkov
 Nothogomphodon danilovi, Tatarinov
 Diademodontids
 Scalenodon boreus, Tatarinov
 Traversodontids
 Antecosuchus ochevi, Tatarinov
 Therapsids
 Calleonasus furvus
 Cristonasus koltaeviensi
 Elatosaurus facetus
 Nasoplanites danilovi
 Parvobestiola bashkiriensis
 Rabidosaurus cristatus
 Rhadiodromus klimovi
 Fish
 Ceratodus bucobaensis, C. recticristatus
 Archosaurs
 Dongusuchus efremovi, Sennikov

See also 
 Bukobay Formation
 Triassic land vertebrate faunachrons

References 

Geologic formations of Russia
Triassic System of Europe
Triassic Russia
Anisian Stage
Sandstone formations
Shale formations
Conglomerate formations
Fluvial deposits
Deltaic deposits
Paleontology in Russia
Formations